DWAD (1098 AM) Now Radio is a radio station owned and operated by Crusaders Broadcasting System, a media outlet owned by Cesar A. Dumlao, a government official during the martial law era under Ferdinand Marcos. Its studios are located at the 1st floor, Dumlao Sports Center, 304 Shaw Blvd., Mandaluyong, while its transmitter located at 209 E. Dela Paz St., Mandaluyong. It airs Mondays to Saturdays from 6:00 AM to 11:00 PM, and on Sundays from 6:00 AM to 12:00 MN.

History
DWAD was a music station during the Martial Law era. Among its notable personalities were Lito Gorospe, Rino Basilio, Rene Jose, Mely Factoran and Manolo Favis. Currently, the station broadcasts brokered programming, consisting of mostly religious programs (Christian and Islamic), with music fillers playing Classic Hits. Since December 1, 2018, the station adopted the Now Radio brand.

See also
DWCD-FM

References

DWAD
Radio stations established in 1973